Kathleen Peterson may refer to:
 Kathleen Peterson (murder victim)
 Kathleen Peterson (artist)